Garland Dean Boyette (March 22, 1940 – April 19, 2022) was an American professional football player who was a linebacker in the American Football League (AFL) and National Football League (NFL). He played for the Houston Oilers and St. Louis Cardinals from 1962 to 1972. He also played for the Montreal Alouettes of the Canadian Football League (CFL), as well as the Houston Texans/Shreveport Steamer of the World Football League (WFL). In 1967, he was the regular starting middle linebacker for the Oilers and joined Willie Lanier of the Kansas City Chiefs as the first African-Americans to start that position in professional football.

Early life
Boyette was born in Rayville, Louisiana, on March 22, 1940. He attended Wallace High School in Orange, Texas, graduating in 1958.  He initially studied at Northwestern University, but left after the first semester and ultimately transferred to study biology at Grambling State University on the recommendation of his nephew, Ernie Ladd.  Boyette was in the starting lineup for the Grambling State Tigers during his sophomore year, playing as a guard and defensive tackle and later receiving All-American honors at those positions.  Together with Ladd, Jerry Robinson, and Roosevelt Taylor, he helped the Tigers finish 9–1 during the 1960 season, with the team recording three shutouts and scoring over 60 points on three occasions.  The school went on to win its first Southwestern Athletic Conference (SWAC) championship that year.

Boyette was also a track and field athlete who was selected as an All-American three times.  He competed in the 1960 United States Olympic trials and narrowly missed qualifying for decathlon.  He identified the pole vault and long-distance running as the most challenging events for him, stating he "never felt safe on that aluminum pole".  Upon graduating in 1962, Boyette was left undrafted in that year's NFL Draft.  He eventually signed with the St. Louis Cardinals and changed positions to middle linebacker, learning the role over the summer of 1962.

Career
Boyette made his NFL debut with the Cardinals in 1962, and played in 14 games (6 starts) during his first season.  He was recognized as the first African-American to start at middle linebacker in professional football, together with Willie Lanier (who made his NFL debut in 1967), and later recounted receiving hate mail as a result.  After two seasons with the franchise, Boyette left for the Canadian Football League, having become disillusioned by the higher salary of newer NFL players compared to his.  He subsequently played for the Montreal Alouettes from 1964 to 1965, winning the league's Most Valuable Player Award and being selected as an All-Canadian during the latter season.

Boyette went back to the US in 1966, signing with the American Football League's Houston Oilers, reuniting with Wally Lemm, his former coach at the Cardinals.  The Oilers finished atop of the Eastern Division during Boyette's second season with the team in 1967, and also qualified for the playoffs two years later.  He was named to the AFL All-Star team in 1968 and 1969.  During the 1971 season, he finished sixth in the league in fumbles recovered (4), ninth in non-offensive touchdowns (1), and tied for most fumble return touchdowns (1).  Boyette briefly retired at the end of the 1972 season and proceeded to serve as the Oilers' quality control coach.  After two seasons in that position, he returned to play for the Houston Texans of the World Football League.  Midway through the 1974 season, the Texans relocated to Shreveport and were renamed the Steamer.  Boyette finished his career with the Shreveport Steamer in 1975, at the age of 35.

Boyette was inducted into the Grambling Legends Sports Hall of Fame in July 2010.  Six years later, he was enshrined into the SWAC Hall of Fame.  He was also honored in the Sports Legends Gallery at the Museum of the Gulf Coast.

Personal life
Boyette was married to Winetta, with whom he had three children. He was the uncle of Paul Boyette Jr., who played for the Texas Longhorns and also went undrafted before signing with the Oakland Raiders in 2017.  After retiring from professional football, Boyette was employed as a manager for Southwestern Bell for 28 years.  He worked in that capacity until retiring in the early 2000s, after which he served as a motivational speaker, as well as a volunteer with the Boys & Girls Club in Houston and the Special Olympics.  He resided in Missouri City, Texas, during his later years in a house that he constructed.  Boyette attended the Bayou Classic annually in his retirement.

Boyette died on the evening of April 19, 2022, in Houston, aged 82.

See also
List of American Football League players

References

1940 births
2022 deaths
AT&T people
African-American players of American football
American Football League All-Star players
American Football League players
American football linebackers
Grambling State Tigers football players
Houston Oilers players
Houston Texans (WFL) players
Montreal Alouettes players
People from Missouri City, Texas
People from Orange, Texas
Players of American football from Louisiana
Players of American football from Texas
Shreveport Steamer players
St. Louis Cardinals (football) players